This is a list of National Hockey League (NHL) players who have played at least one game in the NHL from 1917 to present and have a last name that starts with "O".

List updated as of the 2018–19 NHL season.

O'

 Dennis O'Brien
 Doug O'Brien
 Ellard "Obie" O'Brien
 Jim O'Brien
 Liam O'Brien
 Shane O'Brien
 Jack O'Callahan
 Mike O'Connell
 Herbert "Buddy" O'Connor
 Drew O'Connor
 Logan O'Connor
 Matt O'Connor
 Myles O'Connor
 Eric O'Dell
 Fred O'Donnell
 Sean O'Donnell
 Don O'Donoghue
 Billy O'Dwyer
 Gerry O'Flaherty
 John "Peanuts" O'Flaherty
 Rob O'Gara
 George O'Grady
 Ryan O'Marra
 Jim O'Neil
 Paul O'Neil
 Brian O'Neill
 Jeff O'Neill
 Mike O'Neill
 Tom "Windy" O'Neill
 Wes O'Neill
 Will O'Neill
 Willie O'Ree
 Daniel O'Regan
 Tom O'Regan
 Cal O'Reilly
 Ryan O'Reilly
 Terry O'Reilly
 Danny O'Shea
 Kevin O'Shea
 Chris O'Sullivan
 Patrick O'Sullivan

Oa–Oz

 Adam Oates
 Russell Oatman
 Evan Oberg
 Jaroslav Obsut
 Chris Oddleifson
 Lyle Odelein
 Selmar Odelein
 Jeff Odgers
 Gino Odjick
 Gerry Odrowski
 Johnny Oduya
 Jordan Oesterle
 Jake Oettinger
 Brian Ogilvie
 John Ogrodnick
 Mattias Ohlund
 Janne Ojanen
 Todd Okerlund
 Kyle Okposo
 Roman Oksiuta
 Fredrik Olausson
 Eddie Olczyk
 Jamie Oleksiak
 Steven Oleksy
 Bill Oleschuk
 Danny Olesevich
 Rostislav Olesz
 David Oliver
 Harry Oliver
 Murray Oliver
 Mathieu Olivier
 Krzysztof Oliwa
 Bert Olmstead
 Gustav Olofsson
 Victor Olofsson
 Darryl Olsen
 Dylan Olsen
 Dennis Olson
 Josh Olson
 Christer Olsson
 Peter Olvecky
 Mark Olver
 Jimmie Olvestad
 Linus Omark
 Ben Ondrus
 Bill Orban
 Phil Oreskovic
 Victor Oreskovich
 Gates Orlando
 Jimmy Orlando
 Dave Orleski
 Dmitri Orlov
 Brooks Orpik
 Bobby Orr
 Colton Orr
 Vladimir Orszagh
 Joni Ortio
 Jed Ortmeyer
 Oskar Osala
 Keith Osborne
 Mark Osborne
 Randy Osburn
 Chris Osgood
 T. J. Oshie
 Mark Osiecki
 Jaroslav Otevrel
 Steve Ott
 Joel Otto
 Maxime Ouellet
 Michel Ouellet
 Xavier Ouellet
 Eddie Ouellette
 Gerry Ouellette
 Ted Ouimet
 Alexander Ovechkin
 Dennis Owchar
 George Owen
 Nathan Oystrick
 Igor Ozhiganov
 Sandis Ozolinsh

See also
 hockeydb.com NHL Player List - O

Players